Slocan was a provincial electoral district in the Canadian province of British Columbia. It made its first appearance in the election of 1903 and its last in the general election of 1920. It was succeeded by the Kaslo-Slocan riding in the 1924 election.

For other current and historical electoral districts in the Kootenay region, please see Kootenay (electoral districts).

Demographics

Political Geography

Notable Elections

Notable MLAs

Electoral history
Note: Winners in each election are in bold.

|-

|Labour 1
|William Davidson
|align="right"|358
|align="right"|55.33%
|align="right"|
|align="right"|unknown

|- bgcolor="white"
!align="right" colspan=3|Total valid votes
!align="right"|647
!align="right"|100.00%
!align="right"|
|- bgcolor="white"
!align="right" colspan=3|Total rejected ballots
!align="right"|
!align="right"|
!align="right"|
|- bgcolor="white"
!align="right" colspan=3|Turnout
!align="right"|%
!align="right"|
!align="right"|
|- bgcolor="white"
!align="right" colspan=7|1 Nominated by the Slocan Labour Party, which was based on the Provincial Progressive Party of 1902, and supported by the Socialists 
|}

|-

|Liberal
|Archibald B. Docksteader
|align="right"|81 	
|align="right"|20.61%
|align="right"|
|align="right"|unknown

|- bgcolor="white"
!align="right" colspan=3|Total valid votes
!align="right"|393
!align="right"|100.00%
!align="right"|
|- bgcolor="white"
!align="right" colspan=3|Total rejected ballots
!align="right"|
!align="right"|
!align="right"|
|- bgcolor="white"
!align="right" colspan=3|Turnout
!align="right"|%
!align="right"|
!align="right"|
|}

|-

|- bgcolor="white"
!align="right" colspan=3|Total valid votes
!align="right"|571
!align="right"|100.00%
!align="right"|
|- bgcolor="white"
!align="right" colspan=3|Total rejected ballots
!align="right"|
!align="right"|
!align="right"|
|- bgcolor="white"
!align="right" colspan=3|Turnout
!align="right"|%
!align="right"|
!align="right"|
|}

|-

|Liberal
|Charles Franklin Nelson
|align="right"|448
|align="right"|50.06%
|align="right"|
|align="right"|unknown
|- bgcolor="white"
!align="right" colspan=3|Total valid votes
!align="right"|895
!align="right"|100.00%
!align="right"|
|- bgcolor="white"
!align="right" colspan=3|Total rejected ballots
!align="right"|
!align="right"|
!align="right"|
|- bgcolor="white"
!align="right" colspan=3|Turnout
!align="right"|%
!align="right"|
!align="right"|
|}

|-

|Liberal
|Charles Franklin Nelson
|align="right"|471 	
|align="right"|34.46%
|align="right"|
|align="right"|unknown

|Federated Labour Party 2
|Alfred Harvey Smith
|align="right"|328 	
|align="right"|23.99%
|align="right"|
|align="right"|unknown
|- bgcolor="white"
!align="right" colspan=3|Total valid votes
!align="right"|1,367 
!align="right"|100.00%
!align="right"|
|- bgcolor="white"
!align="right" colspan=3|Total rejected ballots
!align="right"|
!align="right"|
!align="right"|
|- bgcolor="white"
!align="right" colspan=3|
!align="right"|76.94%
!align="right"|
!align="right"|
|- bgcolor="white"
!align="right" colspan=7|2 Also referred to as "O.B.U." (One Big Union) candidate
|}

Sources
Elections BC historical returns

Former provincial electoral districts of British Columbia